The 1996 Espirito Santo Trophy took place 7–10 November at St. Elena Golf Club in Manila, Philippines. 

It was the 17th women's golf World Amateur Team Championship for the Espirito Santo Trophy.

The tournament was a stroke play team event, due to heavy rain, shortened from 72 holes to 54 holes. There were 34 team entries, each with three players. The best two scores for each round counted towards the team total.

The South Korea team won the Trophy for their first title, beating team Italy by two strokes. Italy earned the silver medal while the defending champions United States took the bronze on third place another four strokes back.

The individual title went to Silvia Cavalleri, Italy, whose score of one-over-par, 217, was one stroke ahead of Janice Moodie, Great Britain & Ireland.

Teams 
34 teams entered the event and completed the competition. Each team had three players.

Results 
The first round of the 72-hole tournament was cancelled due to monsoon rains and lightning and the competition was played over 54 holes. Players were permitted to lift, clean and place their balls on the fairway during all three completed rounds. 

Sources:

Individual leaders 
There was no official recognition for the lowest individual scores.

References

External links 
World Amateur Team Championships on International Golf Federation website

Espirito Santo Trophy
Golf tournaments in Asia
Espirito Santo Trophy
Espirito Santo Trophy
Espirito Santo Trophy